Colchester was a federal electoral district in Nova Scotia, Canada, that was represented in the House of Commons of Canada from 1867 to 1935. It was created in the British North America Act, 1867, and was abolished in 1933 when it was merged into Colchester—Hants riding. The district consisted of the County of Colchester.

Members of Parliament

This riding has elected the following Members of Parliament:

Election results

See also 

 List of Canadian federal electoral districts
 Past Canadian electoral districts

External links 
 Riding history for Colchester (1867–1933) from the Library of Parliament

Former federal electoral districts of Nova Scotia